Kaena or Kaena Point is the westernmost tip of the island of Oahu. In Hawaiian, kaena means "the heat". The area was named after a brother or cousin of Pele. The point is designated as a Natural Area Reserve.

History
In Hawaiian, kaena means "the heat". The area was named after a brother or cousin of Pele who accompanied her from Kahiki. The State of Hawaii has designated the point as a Natural Area Reserve to protect nesting Laysan Albatrosses and wedge-tailed Shearwaters, Hawaiian monk seals, and the fragile (to vehicular traffic) native strand vegetation that has been restored there.

According to ancient Hawaiian folklore, Kaena Point is the "jumping-off" point for souls leaving this world.

In 1899, the Oahu Railway and Land Company constructed a railway that encompassed 70 miles from Honolulu through Kahuku to transport sugarcane. Most of the tracks were destroyed by a tsunami in 1946. Parts of them are visible along the Ka'ena Point Trail.

Ecology
Ka'ena Point sustains an ecosystem that is home to many native Hawaiian plants and animals.

Plants:
 ‘ohai (Sesbania tomentosa)
 naupaka kahakai (Scaevola sericea)
 ‘ilima papa (Sida falax)
 naio (Myoporum sandwicense)
 pa‘u-o-Hi‘iaka (Jacquemontia ovalifolia)
 ma‘o - Hawaiian cotton (Gossypium tomentosum)
 Ka‘ena ‘akoko (Chamaesyce celastroides var. kaenana)
 hinahina (Heliotropium anomulum)
 pohinahina (Vitex rotundifolia)
 nehe (Lipochaeta integrifolia)
 'Ahinahina (Achyranthes splendens)

Animals:
 Hawaiian Monk Seal (Neomonachus schauinslandi)
 Moli (Phoebastria immutabilis)
 Yellow Faced Bees (Hylaeus longiceps)

Preservation

In 2011, the United States' first predator-proof fence was constructed at Ka’ena Point, costing about $290,000. The fence is about 2,133 feet long (650 m), and encompasses  of land. The population of Wedge-tailed Shearwater fledglings, Laysan Albatross fledglings, Ohia, Sandalwood trees, and several other species has risen significantly.

Access
Ka'ena Point is a park and hiking site, and is also known for snorkeling. This spot has a white sandy beach that runs from Oahu's western tip  to the Waianae Mountains. A  can be entered from Keawaula Beach or Mokuleia.

During the winter, Oahu's North Shore is typically bombarded by large, powerful waves that attract surfers from around the world. This has not been confirmed, but during the "Swell Of The Century" in 1969, on the day of Greg Noll's famous wave at Mākaha, Noll took a picture of a gigantic wave breaking at Kaena Point. Until "Biggest Wednesday" on 28 January 1998, when professional surfer Ken Bradshaw was photographed riding a wave with a reported  face, it was believed that Noll's picture showed the largest wave ever photographed. During that famous swell in January 1998, several people reported seeing waves with  faces at Kaena Point.

References

External links
 
  Ka‘ena Point Ecosystem Restoration Project, Division of Forestry and Wildlife, Hawaii Department of Land and Natural Resources

Headlands of Hawaii
Landforms of Oahu
Protected areas of Oahu
State parks of Hawaii